California's 35th congressional district is a U.S. congressional district in California.

The district is based in the Inland Empire, including the communities of Chino, Eastvale, Fontana, Montclair, Ontario, Pomona, Rancho Cucamonga, and Upland.

Competitiveness

In statewide races

Composition

As of the 2020 redistricting, California's 35th congressional district is located in Southern California, within the Inland Empire. The district covers east Los Angeles County, southwest San Bernardino County, and a small part of west Riverside County.

Los Angeles County is split between this district, the 28th district, the 31st district, and the 38th district. They are partitioned by Highway 60, Phillips Ranch Rd, E Village Loop Rd, Quail Creek Ln, Falcon Ridge Dr, Hidden Valley Rd, Oak Cliff Dr, Willowbrook Ln, Westbrook Ln, La Sierra Dr, Avenida Rancheros, Rancheros Navato Dr, Serra Dr, Alta Mira Pl, Rancho Laguna Dr, W Mission Blvd, W Temple Ave, Pomona Blvd, Valley Blvd, San Bernardino Freeway, Walnut City Parkland, San Bernardino Freeway, Fairplex Dr, Via Verde, Puddingstone Reservoir, McKinley Ave, N Whittle Ave, Arrow Highway, Fulton Rd, Foothill Blvd, Towne Ave, Harrison Ave, Carnegie Ave, W Arrow Highway, Mountain Ave, and E American Ave. The 35th district takes in the city of Pomona.

San Bernardino County is split between this district, the 28th district, the 33rd district, and the 40th district. The 35th, 28th and 33rd are partitioned by W 16th St, E 15th St, Grove Ave, Foothill Blvd, Vineyard Blvd, San Bernardino Rd, Orangewood Dr, Estacia St, Lion St, Highway 66, Helms Ave, Hampshire St, Archibald Ave, N Maple Ave, S Maple Ave, Randall Ave, Alder Ave, Union Pacific Railroad, Slover Ave, Tamarind Ave, Jurupa Ave, 11th St, and Locust Ave. The 35th and 40th are partitioned by Highway 71, Eucalyptus Ave, Peyton Dr, Highway 142, Tupelo Ave, Hazelwood Dr, Pipeline Ave, Los Serranos Blvd, Country Club Dr, Soquel Canyon Parkway, Elinvar Dr, Sapphire Rd, Onyx Rd, Copper Rd, Slate Dr, Butterfield Ranch Rd, Pine Ave, and Chino Valley Freeway. The 35th district takes in Chino, Montclair, Ontario, and the south sides of Rancho Cucamonga, Fontana, and Upland, as well as the Los Serranos neighborhood of Chino Hills.

Riverside County is split between this district and the 41st district. They are partitioned by Chino Creek, Santa Ana River, Chandler St, Archibald Ave, Schleisman Rd, Scholar Way, Citrus Way, Hamner Ave, Corona Freeway, and E Philadelphia St. The 35th district takes in the north side of the city of Eastvale.

Cities & CDP with 10,000 or more people
 Fontana - 208,393
 Ontario - 175,265
 Pomona - 151,713
 Chino - 91,403
 Upland - 79,040
 Eastvale - 69,757
 Montclair - 40,083

List of members representing the district

Election results

1962

1964

1966

1968

1970 (Special)

1970

1972

1974

1976

1978

1980

1982

1984

1986

1988

1990

1992

1994

1996

1998

2000

2002

2004

2006

2008

2010

2012

2014

2016

2018

2020

2022

Historical district boundaries
From 2003 to 2013, the district was based in Los Angeles County. The district was composed of parts of the Westchester District of the City of Los Angeles and the cities of Inglewood, Hawthorne, Gardena and Florence-Graham, as well as some adjacent areas.

See also
List of United States congressional districts

References

External links
GovTrack.us: California's 35th congressional district
RAND California Election Returns: District Definitions
California Voter Foundation map - CD35

35
Government of Los Angeles County, California
Government of San Bernardino County, California
Chino, California
Colton, California
Fontana, California
Montclair, California
Ontario, California
Pomona, California
Upland, California
Rancho Cucamonga, California
Eastvale, California
Pomona Valley
Rialto, California
Inland Empire
Constituencies established in 1963
1963 establishments in California